Scout is a research operating system developed at the University of Arizona.  It is communication-oriented and designed around the constraints of network-connected devices like set-top boxes.

The Scout researchers had in mind a class of devices that they called "network appliances", which include cameras and disks attached to a network.  They believed that these devices have in common the following three characteristics:

 Communication-Oriented
 Specialized/Diverse Functionality
 Predictable Performance with Scarce Resources

To satisfy these three requirements, Scout was designed around an abstraction called a "path"; was highly configurable; and offered scheduling and resource allocation policies that provided predictable performance under load.

See also 
Single address space operating system

External links 
Scout Home Page

Embedded operating systems
University of Arizona